Thomas Isidore Noël Sankara (21 December 1949 – 15 October 1987) was a Burkinabé military officer, revolutionary and Pan-Africanist who served as President of Burkina Faso from his coup in 1983 to his assassination in 1987. Viewed by supporters as a charismatic and iconic figure of revolution, he is commonly referred to as 'Africa's Che Guevara'.

After being appointed Prime Minister in 1983, disputes with the sitting government led to Sankara's eventual imprisonment. While he was under house arrest, a group of revolutionaries seized power on his behalf in a popularly-supported coup later that year. Aged 33, Sankara became the President of the Republic of Upper Volta and launched social, ecological and economic programmes and renamed the country from the French colonial name Upper Volta to Burkina Faso ('Land of Incorruptible People'), with its people being called Burkinabé ('upright people'). His foreign policies were centred on anti-imperialism and he rejected aid from organizations such as the International Monetary Fund. Sankara welcomed foreign aid from other sources but tried to reduce reliance on aid by boosting domestic revenues and diversifying the sources of assistance.

His domestic policies included famine prevention, agrarian self-sufficiency, land reform, and suspending rural poll taxes. He also focused on a nationwide literacy campaign and vaccinating program against meningitis, yellow fever and measles. His government also focused on building schools, health centres, water reservoirs, and infrastructure projects. He also combated desertification of the Sahel by planting over 10 million trees. Moreover, he outlawed female genital mutilation, forced marriages and polygamy. Sankara set up Cuban-inspired Committees for the Defence of the Revolution. He set up Popular Revolutionary Tribunals to prosecute public officials charged with political crimes and corruption, considering such elements of the state counter-revolutionaries. This led to criticism by Amnesty International for human rights violations, including extrajudicial executions and arbitrary detentions of political opponents.

Sankara’s revolutionary programmes for African self-reliance made him an icon to many of Africa's poor, and Sankara remained popular with a considerable majority of his country's citizens, though some of his policies alienated elements of the former ruling class, including the tribal leaders — and the governments of France and its ally the Ivory Coast. On 15 October 1987, Sankara was assassinated by troops led by Blaise Compaoré, who assumed leadership of the state shortly thereafter, and until the 2014 Burkina Faso uprising.

Early life 

Thomas Sankara was born Thomas Isidore Noël Sankara on 21 December 1949 in Yako, French Upper Volta, as the third of ten children to Joseph and Marguerite Sankara. His father, Joseph Sankara, a gendarme, was of mixed Mossi–Fulani (Silmi–Moaga) heritage while his mother, Marguerite Kinda, was of direct Mossi descent. He spent his early years in Gaoua, a town in the humid southwest to which his father was transferred as an auxiliary gendarme. As the son of one of the few African functionaries then employed by the colonial state, he enjoyed a relatively privileged position. The family lived in a brick house with the families of other gendarmes at the top of a hill overlooking the rest of Gaoua.

Sankara attended primary school at Bobo-Dioulasso. He applied himself seriously to his schoolwork and excelled in mathematics and French. He went to church often, and impressed with his energy and eagerness to learn, some of the priests encouraged Thomas to go on to seminary school once he finished primary school. Despite initially agreeing, he took the exam required for entry to the sixth grade in the secular educational system and passed. Thomas's decision to keep on his education at the nearest lycée Ouezzin Coulibaly (named after a pre-independence nationalist) proved to be a turning point. This step got him out of his father's household since the lycée was in Bobo-Dioulasso, the country's commercial centre. At the lycée, Sankara made close friends, including Fidèle Too, whom he later named a minister in his government; and Soumane Touré, who was in a more advanced class.

His Roman Catholic parents wanted him to become a priest, but he chose to enter the military. The military was popular at the time, having just ousted a despised president. It was also seen by young intellectuals as a national institution that might potentially help to discipline the inefficient and corrupt bureaucracy, counterbalance the inordinate influence of traditional chiefs and generally help modernize the country. Besides, acceptance into the military academy would come with a scholarship; Sankara could not easily afford the costs of further education otherwise. He took the entrance exam and passed.

He entered the military academy of Kadiogo in Ouagadougou with the academy's first intake of 1966 at the age of 17. While there he witnessed the first military coup d'état in Upper Volta led by Lieutenant-Colonel Sangoulé Lamizana (3 January 1966). The trainee officers were taught by civilian professors in the social sciences. Adama Touré, who taught history and geography and was known for having progressive ideas, even though he did not publicly share them, was the academic director at the time. He invited a few of his brightest and more political students, among them Sankara, to join informal discussions about imperialism, neocolonialism, socialism and communism, the Soviet and Chinese revolutions, the liberation movements in Africa and similar topics outside of the classroom. This was the first time Sankara was systematically exposed to a revolutionary perspective on Upper Volta and the world. Aside from his academic and extracurricular political activities, Sankara also pursued his passion for music and played the guitar.

In 1970, 20 year old Sankara went on for further military studies at the military academy of Antsirabe in Madagascar, from which he graduated as a junior officer in 1973. At the Antsirabe academy, the range of instruction went beyond standard military subjects, which allowed Sankara to study agriculture, including how to raise crop yields and better the lives of farmers—themes he later took up in his own administration and country. During that period, he read profusely on history and military strategy, thus acquiring the concepts and analytical tools that he would later use in his reinterpretation of Burkinabe political history.

Military career 
After basic military training in secondary school in 1966, Sankara began his military career at the age of 19 and a year later was sent to Madagascar for officer training at Antsirabe where he witnessed popular uprisings in 1971 and 1972 against the government of Philibert Tsiranana and first read the works of Karl Marx and Vladimir Lenin, profoundly influencing his political views for the rest of his life.

Returning to Upper Volta in 1972, he fought in a border war between Upper Volta and Mali by 1974. He earned fame for his performance in the conflict, but years later would renounce the fighting as 'useless and unjust', a reflection of his growing political consciousness. He also became a popular figure in the capital of Ouagadougou. Sankara was a decent guitarist. He played in a band named Tout-à-Coup Jazz and rode a bicycle.

In 1976 he became commander of the Commando Training Centre in Pô. In the same year he met Blaise Compaoré in Morocco. During the presidency of Colonel Saye Zerbo, a group of young officers formed a secret organization called the 'Communist Officers' Group' (or ROC), the best-known members being Henri Zongo, Jean-Baptiste Boukary Lingani, Blaise Compaoré and Sankara.

Government posts 
Sankara was appointed Minister of Information in Saye Zerbo's military government in September 1981. Sankara differentiated himself from other government officials in many ways such as biking to work everyday, instead of driving in a car. While his predecessors would censor journalists and newspapers, Sankara encouraged investigative journalism and allowed the media to print whatever it found. This led to publications of government scandals by both privately-owned and state-owned newspapers. He resigned on 12 April 1982 in opposition to what he saw as the regime's anti-labour drift, declaring 'Misfortune to those who gag the people!'.

After another coup (7 November 1982) brought to power Major-Doctor Jean-Baptiste Ouédraogo, Sankara became Prime Minister in January 1983 but he was dismissed (17 May). In between those four months, Sankara pushed Ouédraogo's regime for more progressive reforms. Sankara was then arrested after the French President's African affairs adviser, Guy Penne, met with Col. Yorian Somé. Henri Zongo and Jean-Baptiste Boukary Lingani were also placed under arrest. The decision to arrest Sankara proved to be very unpopular with the younger officers in the military regime and his imprisonment created enough momentum for his friend Blaise Compaoré to lead another coup.

Presidency 

A coup d'état organized by Blaise Compaoré made Sankara President on 4 August 1983 at the age of 33. The coup d'état was supported by Libya, which was at the time on the verge of war with France in Chad (see history of Chad).

Sankara saw himself as a revolutionary and was inspired by the examples of Cuba's Fidel Castro and Che Guevara and Ghana's military leader Jerry Rawlings. As President, he promoted the 'Democratic and Popular Revolution' (or RDP). His policy was oriented toward fighting corruption and promoting reforestation.

On 4 August 1984, the first anniversary of his accession, he renamed the country Burkina Faso, meaning 'the land of upright people' in Mooré and Dyula, the two major languages of the country. He also gave it a new flag and wrote a new national anthem (Ditanyè).

Health care and public works 
Sankara's first priorities after taking office were feeding, housing and giving medical care to his people who desperately needed it. Sankara launched a mass vaccination programme in an attempt to eradicate polio, meningitis and measles. From 1983 to 1985, 2 million Burkinabé were vaccinated.

Prior to Sankara's presidency infant mortality in Burkina Faso was about 20.8%; during his presidency it fell to 14.5%. Sankara's administration was also the first African government to publicly recognize the AIDS epidemic as a major threat to Africa.

Large-scale housing and infrastructure projects were also undertaken. Brick factories were created to help build houses in effort to end urban slums. In an attempt to fight deforestation, The People's Harvest of Forest Nurseries was created to supply 7,000 village nurseries, as well as organizing the planting of several million trees. All regions of the country were soon connected by a vast road- and rail-building programme. Over  of rail was laid by Burkinabé people to facilitate manganese extraction in 'The Battle of the Rails' without any foreign aid or outside money. These programmes were an attempt to prove that African countries could be prosperous without foreign help or aid.

Sankara also launched education programmes to help combat the country's 90% illiteracy rate. These programmes had some success in the first few years. Shortly after the assassination of Sankara, wide-scale teachers' strikes, coupled with the new regime's unwillingness to negotiate, led to the creation of 'Revolutionary Teachers'. In an attempt to replace the nearly 2,500 teachers fired over a strike in 1996, anyone with a college degree was invited to teach through the revolutionary teachers' programme. Volunteers merely received a 10-day training course before beginning to teach.

People's Revolutionary Tribunals 
Shortly after attaining power, Sankara constructed a system of courts known as the Popular Revolutionary Tribunal. The courts were created originally to try former government officials in a straightforward way so the average Burkinabé could participate in or oversee trials of enemies of the revolution. They placed defendants on trial for corruption, tax evasion or counter-revolutionary activity. Sentences for former government officials were light and often suspended. The tribunals have been alleged to have been only show trials, held very openly with oversight from the public.

According to the US State Department, procedures in these trials, especially legal protections for the accused, did not conform to international standards. Defendants had to prove themselves innocent of the crimes they were charged with committing and were not allowed to be represented by counsel. The courts were originally met with adoration from the Burkinabé people but over time became corrupt and oppressive. So called 'lazy workers' were tried and sentenced to work for free or expelled from their jobs and discriminated against. Some even created their own courts to settle scores and humiliate their enemies.

Revolutionary Defence Committees 
The Committees for the Defence of the Revolution were formed as mass armed organizations. The CDRs were created as a counterweight to the power of the army as well as to promote political and social revolution. The idea for the Revolutionary Defence Committees was taken from Fidel Castro, whose Committees for the Defence of the Revolution were created as a form of 'revolutionary vigilance'.

Sankara's CDRs overstepped their power, and were accused by some of thuggery and gang-like behaviour. CDR groups would meddle in the everyday life of the Burkinabé. Individuals would use their power to settle scores or punish enemies. Sankara himself noted the failure publicly. The failure of the CDRs, coupled with the failure of the Revolutionary Teachers programme, mounting labour and middle class disdain, as well as Sankara's steadfastness, led to the regime partially weakening within Burkina Faso.

Relations with the Mossi People 
A point of contention regarding Sankara's rule is the way he handled the Mossi ethnic group. The Mossi are the most populous ethnic group in Burkina Faso, and they adhere to strict traditional hierarchical social systems. At the top of the hierarchy is the Morho Naba, the chief or king of the Mossi people. Sankara viewed this arrangement as an obstacle to national unity, and proceeded to demote the Mossi elite. The Morho Naba was not allowed to hold courts, and local village chiefs were stripped of their executive powers and given to the CDR.

Women's rights 
Improving women's status in Burkinabé society was one of Sankara's explicit goals, and his government included a large number of women, an unprecedented policy priority in West Africa. His government banned female genital mutilation, forced marriages and polygamy, while appointing women to high governmental positions and encouraging them to work outside the home and stay in school even if pregnant. Sankara also promoted contraception and encouraged husbands to go to market and prepare meals to experience for themselves the conditions faced by women. Sankara recognized the challenges faced by African women when he gave his famous address to mark International Women's Day on 8 March 1987 in Ouagadougou. Sankara spoke to thousands of women in a highly political speech in which he stated that the Burkinabé Revolution was 'establishing new social relations' which would be 'upsetting the relations of authority between men and women and forcing each to rethink the nature of both. This task is formidable but necessary'. Furthermore, Sankara was the first African leader to appoint women to major cabinet positions and to recruit them actively for the military.

Agacher Strip War 

Following the 1974 clashes between Burkina Faso and Mali over the disputed territory of the Agacher Strip, the Organization of African Unity had created a mediation commission to resolve the disagreement and provide for an independent, neutral demarcation of the border. Both governments had declared that they would not use armed force to end the dispute. 

Nevertheless, by 1983 the two countries were in disagreement about the work of the commission. Sankara also personally disliked Malian President Moussa Traoré, who had taken power by deposing Modibo Keïta's left-leaning regime. On 17 September Sankara visited Mali and met with Traoré. With Algerian mediation, the two agreed to have the border dispute settled by the International Court of Justice (ICJ) and subsequently petitioned the body to resolve the issue.

In July 1985 Burkina Faso declared the Malian secretary general of the Economic Community of West Africa, Drissa Keita, a persona non grata after he criticized Sankara's regime. In September Sankara delivered a speech in which he called for a revolution in Mali. Malian leaders were particularly sensitive to the inflammatory rhetoric, as their country was experiencing social unrest. Around the same time Sankara and other key figures in the CNR became convinced that Traoré was harbouring opposition to the Burkinabé regime in Bamako and plotting to provoke a border war which would be used to support a counterrevolution.

Tensions at the border first began to rise on 24 November when one Burkinabé national killed another near the border in Soum Province. Malian police crossed the boundary to arrest the murderer and also detained several members of a local Committee for the Defence of the Revolution who were preparing a tribunal. Three days later Malian police entered Kounia to 'restore order'. Burkina Faso made diplomatic representations on the incidents to Mali, but was given no formal response. At the beginning of December Burkina Faso informed Mali and other surrounding countries that it was conducting its decennial national census from 10 to 20 December. On 14 December military personnel entered the Agacher to assist with the census. Mali accused the military authorities of pressuring Malian citizens in border villages to register with the census, a charge which Burkina Faso disputed. In an attempt to reduce tensions, ANAD (a West African treaty organization) dispatched a delegation to Bamako and Ouagadougou to mediate. President of Algeria Chadli Bendjedid also contacted Sankara and Traoré to encourage a peaceful resolution. At the request of ANAD members, Burkina Faso announced the withdrawal of all military personnel from the disputed region.

Despite the declared withdrawal, a 'war of the communiques' ensued as Burkinabé and Malian authorities exchanged hostile messages with one another. Feeling threatened by Sankara, Traoré began preparing Mali for hostilities with Burkina Faso. Three groupements were formed and planned to invade Burkina Faso and converge on the city of Bobo-Dioulasso. Once there, they would rally Burkinabé opposition forces to take Ouagadougou and overthrow Sankara. Former Sankara aide Paul Michaud wrote that the Burkinabé president had actually intended to provoke Mali into conflict with the aim of mobilizing popular support for his regime. According to him "an official—and reliable—Malian source" had reported that mobilization documents dating to 19 December were found on the bodies of fallen Burkinabé soldiers during the ensuing war.

Sankara's efforts to provide evidence of his bona fides were systematically undermined. 'It is hard to believe that the Malian authorities are unaware that the rumors circulating are false,' says U.S. Ambassador Leonardo Neher. A Central Intelligence Agency (CIA) cable states, 'The war was born of Bamako's hope that the conflict would trigger a coup in Burkina Faso.'

At dawn on 25 December 1985, about 150 Malian Army tanks crossed the frontier and attacked several locations. Malian troops also attempted to envelope Bobo-Dioulasso in a pincer attack. The Burkina Faso Army struggled to repel the offensive in the face of superior Malian firepower and were overwhelmed on the northern front; Malian forces quickly secured the towns of Dionouga, Selba, Kouna, and Douna in the Agacher. The Burkinabé government in Ougadougou received word of hostilities at about 13:00 and immediately issued mobilization orders. Various security measures were also imposed across the country, including nighttime blackouts. Burkinabé forces regrouped in the Dionouga area to counter-attack. Captain Compaoré took command of this western front. Under his leadership soldiers split into small groups and employed guerrilla tactics against Malian tanks.

Immediately after hostilities began other African leaders attempted to institute a truce. On the morning of 30 December Burkina Faso and Mali agreed to an ANAD-brokered ceasefire. By then Mali had occupied most of the Agacher Strip. Over 100 Burkinabé and approximately 40 Malian soldiers and civilians were killed during the war. The Burkinabé towns of Ouahigouya, Djibo, and Nassambou were left badly damaged by the fighting. At an ANAD summit in Yamoussoukro on 17 January Traoré and Sankara met and formalized an agreement to end hostilities. The ICJ later split the Agacher; Mali received the more-densely populated western portion and Burkina Faso the eastern section centred on the Béli River. Both countries indicated their satisfaction with the judgement.

Burkina Faso declared that the war was part of an 'international plot' to bring down Sankara's government. It also rejected speculation that it was fought over rumoured mineral wealth in the Agacher. The country's relatively poor performance in the conflict damaged the domestic credibility of the CNR. Some Burkinabé soldiers were angered by Sankara's failure to prosecute the war more aggressively and rally a counteroffensive against Mali. It also demonstrated the country's weak international position and forced the CNR to craft a more moderate image of its policies and goals abroad. The Burkinabé government made little reference to supporting revolution in other countries in the conflict's aftermath, while its relations with France modestly improved. At a rally held after the war, Sankara conceded that his country's military was not adequately armed and announced the commutation of sentences for numerous political prisoners.

Relations with other countries 
Thomas Sankara defined his program as anti-imperialist. In this respect, France became the main target of revolutionary rhetoric. These attacks culminated in François Mitterrand's visit to Burkina Faso in November 1986, during which Thomas Sankara violently criticized French policy for having received Pieter Botha, the Prime Minister of South Africa, and Jonas Savimbi, the leader of UNITA, in France, both 'covered in blood from head to toe'. French economic aid was reduced by 80% between 1983 and 1985.

Guy Penne, President François Mitterrand's advisor on African affairs, organized a media campaign in France to denigrate Thomas Sankara in collaboration with the DGSE, which provided the press with a series of documents on supposed atrocities intended to fuel articles against him.

A program of cooperation with Cuba was set up. After meeting with Fidel Castro, Thomas Sankara sent young Burkinabés to Cuba in September 1986 to receive professional training and to participate in the country's development upon their return. These were volunteers recruited on the basis of a competition with priority given to orphans and children from rural and disadvantaged areas. Some 600 teenagers were flown to Cuba to complete their schooling and receive professional training to become doctors, engineers, agronomists or gynecologists.

Denouncing the support of the United States to Israel and South Africa, he called on African countries to boycott the 1984 Summer Olympics in Los Angeles. At the United Nations General Assembly, he also denounced the invasion of Grenada by the United States, which responded by implementing trade sanctions against Burkina Faso. Also at the UN, he called for an end to the veto power granted to the great powers. In the name of the 'right of peoples to sovereignty', he supported the national demands of the Western Sahara, Palestine, the Nicaraguan Sandinistas and the South African ANC. While he had good relations with Ghanaian leader Jerry Rawlings and Libyan leader Muammar Gaddafi, he was relatively isolated in West Africa. Leaders close to France, such as Houphouët-Boigny in Côte d'Ivoire and Hassan II in Morocco, were particularly hostile to him.

Environment 
In the 1980s, when ecological awareness was still very low, Thomas Sankara was one of the few African leaders to consider environmental protection a priority. He engaged in three major battles: against bush fires 'which will be considered as crimes and will be punished as such'; against cattle roaming 'which infringes on the rights of peoples because unattended animals destroy nature'; and against the anarchic cutting of firewood 'whose profession will have to be organized and regulated'. As part of a development program involving a large part of the population, ten million trees were planted in Burkina Faso in fifteen months during the 'revolution'. To face the advancing desert and recurrent droughts, Thomas Sankara also proposed the planting of wooded strips of about fifty kilometers, crossing the country from east to west. He then thought of extending this vegetation belt to other countries. Cereal production, close to 1.1 billion tons before 1983, rose to 1.6 billion tons in 1987. Jean Ziegler, former UN special rapporteur for the right to food, emphasized that the country 'had become food self-sufficient'.

Criticism 
The British development organization Oxfam recorded the arrest of trade union leaders in 1987. In 1984, seven individuals associated with the previous régime were accused of treason and executed after a summary trial. A teachers' strike the same year resulted in the dismissal of 2,500 teachers; thereafter, non-governmental organizations and unions were harassed or placed under the authority of the Committees for the Defence of the Revolution, branches of which were established in each workplace and which functioned as 'organs of political and social control'.

Popular Revolutionary Tribunals, set up by the government throughout the country, placed defendants on trial for corruption, tax evasion or 'counter-revolutionary' activity. Procedures in these trials, especially legal protections for the accused, did not conform to international standards. According to Christian Morrisson and Jean-Paul Azam of the Organisation for Economic Co-operation and Development, the 'climate of urgency and drastic action in which many punishments were carried out immediately against those who had the misfortune to be found guilty of unrevolutionary behaviour, bore some resemblance to what occurred in the worst days of the French Revolution, during the Reign of Terror. Although few people were killed, violence was widespread'.

Personal image and popularity 

Accompanying his personal charisma, Sankara had an array of original initiatives that contributed to his popularity and brought some international media attention to his government:

Cuba rewarded Sankara with the highest honour of the state, the Order of Jose Marti.

Solidarity 
 He sold off the government fleet of Mercedes cars and made the Renault 5 (the cheapest car sold in Burkina Faso at that time) the official service car of the ministers.
 He reduced the salaries of well-off public servants (including his own) and forbade the use of government chauffeurs and first class airline tickets.
 He opposed foreign aid, saying that 'He who feeds you, controls you'.
 He spoke in forums like the Organization of African Unity against what he described as neocolonialist penetration of Africa through Western trade and finance.
 He called for a united front of African nations to repudiate their foreign debt. He argued that the poor and exploited did not have an obligation to repay money to the rich and exploiting.

 In Ouagadougou, Sankara converted the army's provisioning store into a state-owned supermarket open to everyone (the first supermarket in the country).
 He forced well-off civil servants to pay one month's salary to public projects.
 He refused to use the air conditioning in his office on the grounds that such luxury was not available to anyone but a handful of Burkinabés.
 As President, he lowered his salary to $450 a month and limited his possessions to a car, four bikes, three guitars, a refrigerator, and a broken freezer.

Style 
 He required public servants to wear a traditional tunic, woven from Burkinabé cotton and sewn by Burkinabé craftsmen.
 He was known for jogging unaccompanied through Ouagadougou in his track suit and posing in his tailored military fatigues, with his mother-of-pearl pistol.
 When asked why he did not want his portrait hung in public places, as was the norm for other African leaders, Sankara replied: "There are seven million Thomas Sankaras".
 An accomplished guitarist, he wrote the new national anthem himself.

Africa's Che Guevara 
Sankara is often referred to as "Africa's Che Guevara". Sankara gave a speech marking and honouring the 20th anniversary of Che Guevara's 9 October 1967 execution, one week before his own assassination on 15 October 1987.

Assassination 
On 15 October 1987, Sankara was killed by an armed group with twelve other officials in a coup d'état organized by his former colleague Blaise Compaoré. When accounting for his overthrow, Compaoré stated that Sankara jeopardized foreign relations with former colonial power France and neighbouring Ivory Coast, and accused his former comrade of plotting to assassinate opponents.

Prince Johnson, a former Liberian warlord allied to Charles Taylor and killer of the Liberian other president Samuel Doe whose last hours of life were filmed, told Liberia's Truth and Reconciliation Commission that it was engineered by Charles Taylor. After the coup and although Sankara was known to be dead, some CDRs mounted an armed resistance to the army for several days.

According to Halouna Traoré, the sole survivor of Sankara's assassination, Sankara was attending a meeting with the Conseil de l'Entente. His assassins singled out Sankara and executed him. The assassins then shot at those attending the meeting, killing 12 other people. Sankara's body was riddled with bullets to the back and he was quickly buried in an unmarked grave while his widow Mariam and two children fled the nation. Compaoré immediately reversed the nationalizations, overturned nearly all of Sankara's policies, rejoined the International Monetary Fund and World Bank to bring in 'desperately needed' funds to restore the 'shattered' economy and ultimately spurned most of Sankara's legacy. Compaoré's dictatorship remained in power for 27 years until it was overthrown by popular protests in 2014.

Assassination trial 
In 2017, the Burkina Faso government officially asked the French government to release military documents on the killing of Sankara after his widow accused France of masterminding his assassination.

In April 2021, 34 years after Sankara's assassination, former president Compaoré and 13 others were indicted for complicity in the murder of Sankara as well as other crimes in the coup. This development came as part of President Roch Kaboré's framework of 'national reconciliation'.

In October 2021, the trial against Compaoré and 13 others began in Ouagadougou, with Compaoré being tried in absentia. Ex-presidential security chief Hyacinthe Kafondo, was also tried in absentia. A week before the trial, Compaoré's lawyers stated that he wouldn't be attending the trial which they characterized as having defects, and also emphasized his privilege for immunity, being the former head of state. After requests made by the defence attorneys for more time to prepare their defence, the hearing was postponed until March 1st.

On 6 April 2022, Compaoré and two others were found guilty and sentenced to life in prison in absentia. Eight others were sentenced to between 3 and 20 years in prison. Three were found innocent.

Exhumation 
The exhumation of what are believed to be the remains of Sankara started on African Liberation Day, 25 May 2015. Permission for an exhumation was denied during the rule of his successor, Blaise Compaoré. The exhumation would allow the family to formally identify the remains, a long-standing demand of his family and supporters.

In October 2015, one of the lawyers for Sankara's widow Mariam reported that the autopsy revealed that Sankara's body was 'riddled' with 'more than a dozen' bullets.

Legacy 
Twenty years after his assassination, Sankara was commemorated on 15 October 2007 in ceremonies that took place in Burkina Faso, Mali, Senegal, Niger, Tanzania, Burundi, France, Canada and the United States.

A statue of Sankara was unveiled in 2019 at the location in Ouagadougou where he was assassinated; however due to complaints that it did not match his facial features, a new statue was unveiled a year later.

List of works 
 Thomas Sankara Speaks: The Burkina Faso Revolution, 1983–87, Pathfinder Press: 1988. .
 We Are the Heirs of the World's Revolutions: Speeches from the Burkina Faso Revolution 1983–87, Pathfinder Press: 2007. .
 Women's Liberation and the African Freedom Struggle, Pathfinder Press: 1990. .

Further reading

Books 

 Who killed Sankara?, by Alfred Cudjoe, 1988, University of California, .
 La voce nel deserto, by Vittorio Martinelli and Sofia Massai, 2009, Zona Editrice, .
 Thomas Sankara – An African Revolutionary, by Ernest Harsch, 2014, Ohio University Press, .
 A Certain Amount of Madness: The Life, Politics and Legacies of Thomas Sankara (Black Critique), by Amber Murrey, 2018, Pluto Press, .
 Sankara, Compaoré et la révolution burkinabè, by Ludo Martens and Hilde Meesters, 1989, Editions Aden, .

Historical Novel including Thomas Sankara
 American Spy, by Lauren Wilkinson, 2019, Random House, .

Web articles 
 Burkina Faso's Pure President by Bruno Jaffré.
 Thomas Sankara Lives! by Mukoma Wa Ngugi.
 There Are Seven Million Sankaras by Koni Benson.
 Thomas Sankara: "I have a Dream" by Federico Bastiani.
 Thomas Sankara: Chronicle of an Organised Tragedy by Cheriff M. Sy.
 Thomas Sankara Former Leader of Burkina Faso by Désiré-Joseph Katihabwa.
 Thomas Sankara 20 Years Later: A Tribute to Integrity by Demba Moussa Dembélé.
 Remembering Thomas Sankara, Rebecca Davis, The Daily Maverick, 2013.
 "I can hear the roar of women's silence", Sokarie Ekine, Red Pepper, 2012.
 Thomas Sankara: A View of The Future for Africa and The Third World by Ameth Lo.
 Thomas Sankara on the Emancipation of Women, An internationalist whose ideas live on! by Nathi Mthethwa.
 Thomas Sankara, le Che africain by Pierre Venuat (in French).
 Thomas Sankara e la rivoluzione interrotta by Enrico Palumbo (in Italian).

Documentaries 
 , 1987 documentary by Didier Mauro
 , 1991 documentary by Balufu Bakupa-Kanyinda
 Thomas Sankara: The Upright Man, 2006 documentary by Robin Shuffield
 , 2007 documentary by Thuy-Tiên Hô and Didier Mauro
 , 2011 documentary by Tristan Goasguen
 , 2012 documentary by Christophe Cupelin
 , 2017 documentary by Thuy-Tiên Hô

References

Sources

External links 

 ThomasSankara.net, a website dedicated to Thomas Sankara
 

1949 births
1987 deaths
1987 murders in Africa
African revolutionaries
Assassinated Burkinabé politicians
Assassinated heads of government
Assassinated heads of state
Burkinabé military personnel
Burkinabé communists
Burkinabé pan-Africanists
Burkinabé revolutionaries
Burkinabé Roman Catholics
Heads of state of Burkina Faso
Leaders ousted by a coup
Leaders who took power by coup
Male feminists
Marxist theorists
Assassinated revolutionaries
National anthem writers
People from Nord Region (Burkina Faso)
People from Sud-Ouest Region (Burkina Faso)
People murdered in Burkina Faso
Prime Ministers of Burkina Faso
Anti-imperialism
African Marxists